Czochanie-Góra  is a village in the administrative district of Gmina Rutki, within Zambrów County, Podlaskie Voivodeship, in north-eastern Poland.

References

Villages in Zambrów County